The women's 100 metres hurdles event at the 1990 World Junior Championships in Athletics was held in Plovdiv, Bulgaria, at Deveti Septemvri Stadium on 9 and 10 August.

Medalists

Results

Final
9 August
Wind: +0.3 m/s

Semifinals
10 August

Semifinal 1
Wind: -0.9 m/s

Semifinal 2
Wind: -0.5 m/s

Heats
9 August

Heat 1
Wind: +0.6 m/s

Heat 2
Wind: +0.5 m/s

Heat 3
Wind: +2.4 m/s

Participation
According to an unofficial count, 23 athletes from 18 countries participated in the event.

References

100 metres hurdles
Sprint hurdles at the World Athletics U20 Championships